Thomas S. Garrick (born July 7, 1966) is a retired American professional basketball player who was selected by the Los Angeles Clippers in the second round (45th overall pick) of the 1988 NBA draft. He played guard in four NBA seasons, mainly for the Clippers. Garrick's best year as a Clipper was during the 1989–90 NBA season when he averaged 7.0 ppg in 73 games. He played collegiately at the University of Rhode Island.

He was the head coach of the University of Rhode Island women's basketball team until he resigned following the 2008–09 season. From 2009 to 2015 he served as a women's basketball assistant coach at Vanderbilt University before moving on to Boston College for three seasons. He was the head women's basketball coach at UMass Lowell from 2018 to 2021, before he returned to Vanderbilt as an assistant to his wife Shea Ralph, who became head coach there.

Head coaching record

Personal life
Garrick is married to Vanderbilt head coach, Shea Ralph.

References

External links
 Official Biography, UMass Lowell River Hawks

1966 births
Living people
American expatriate basketball people in Germany
American expatriate basketball people in Spain
American expatriate basketball people in Turkey
American men's basketball players
American women's basketball coaches
Basketball coaches from Rhode Island
Basketball players from Rhode Island
Bayer Giants Leverkusen players
Boston College Eagles women's basketball coaches
Real Betis Baloncesto players
Dallas Mavericks players
Liga ACB players
Los Angeles Clippers draft picks
Los Angeles Clippers players
Minnesota Timberwolves players
People from West Warwick, Rhode Island
Point guards
Rapid City Thrillers players
Rhode Island Rams men's basketball players
San Antonio Spurs players
UMass Lowell River Hawks women's basketball coaches
Vanderbilt Commodores women's basketball coaches
West Warwick High School alumni